The Volkswagen Bora is a small family car, the fourth generation of the Volkswagen Jetta, and the successor to the Volkswagen Vento. Production of the car began in July 1999. Carrying on the wind nomenclature from previous generations, the car was known as the Volkswagen Bora in much of the world. Bora is a winter wind that blows intermittently over the coast of the Adriatic Sea, as well as in parts of Greece, Russia, Turkey, and the Sliven region of Bulgaria. In North America and South Africa, the Volkswagen Jetta moniker was again kept on due to the continued popularity of the car in those markets.

The Mk4 debuted shortly after its larger sibling, the Passat, with rear passenger doors differing from those of a five-door Golf. The car was also offered as an estate/wagon. Options included rain sensor-controlled windshield wipers and automatic climate control.

Two new internal-combustion engines were offered, the 1.8-litre turbo four-cylinder (often referred to as the 1.8 20vT), and the VR6. The suspension setup remained much as before. However, it was softened considerably in most models to give a comfortable ride, which was met with some criticism as it was still quite hard in comparison with rivals such as vehicles offered from French carmakers.

Diesel

In 2004, a new range of Pumpe-Düse (PD) Unit Injector diesel engines was offered. The design employed unit injectors along with additional electronics and emissions equipment to meet emissions standards in Europe and North America, and is more complex than diesel engines previously offered. To accomplish the task of producing sufficient power while meeting emissions standards, the "PD" technology injects fuel directly into the combustion chamber at pressures up to 2,050 bar (30,000 psi). The purpose of the high pressure is to promote fine atomisation of the fuel, which supports more complete combustion. To reduce noise, the engine employs a "pilot injection" system that injects a small amount of fuel prior to the main injection. All of the new generation of diesel engines required a special motor oil to meet Volkswagen oil specification 505.01 (or newer), noting that serious damage to the engine, particularly the camshaft and injectors, will result if oil not meeting this standard is used.

Safety
The car was manufactured using highly mechanised presses, improved measuring techniques, and laser welding of the roof. In crash tests, the fourth-generation car received very good marks. In the New Car Assessment Program tests conducted by the National Highway Traffic Safety Administration, the car received five out of five stars for both driver and passenger protection in a 56-km/h (35-mph) frontal impact. New side-impact tests at 62 km/h (38.5 mph) awarded the car four out of five stars for both driver and rear-seat passenger protection. Side-curtain airbags became standard in the 2001 model year. In the more severe 64-km/h (40-mph) offset test conducted by the Insurance Institute for Highway Safety, the Mark 4 was awarded the highest score of "Good". Injury, collision, and theft losses were low for a car of its class.

The Bora in its most basic Latin American configuration with 2 airbags received 3 stars for adult occupants and 3 stars for toddlers from Latin NCAP in 2012.

Testing and review
The Bora/Jetta A4 was praised for its adequate handling and a moderately comfortable ride. Other reviewers noted the car to be a somewhat expensive choice in the compact-car segment. Some complaints were made that the back seats lacked adequate room for two adults. Some found the seat cushioning too firm. The interior was praised for the high level of fit, but is sparsely equipped. New in this generation was Volkswagen's signature blue and red instrument lighting, which became standard in all models in 1999. The climate controls were placed low on the console. The recirculation mode cannot be turned on when air is vented to the windshield, and if the driver changes the climate control to vent air to the windshield, an internal mechanism would turn off the recirculation mode. The power outlet is recessed next to the ash tray and is covered with two flaps, one of which is shared with the ash tray. Retractable cup holders were placed directly above the stereo, obscuring vision of the stereo display and could allow beverages to spill on the stereo, gear selector, and other sensitive components during vehicle movement. Rear passengers have a pair of retractable cup holders located under the cylindrical ash tray on the center console. These problems were rectified in 2003 for the US market by placing two recessed cup holders in tandem in the center console and another behind the arm rest pedestal for rear passengers. The driver must raise the arm rest to access the center cup holder, and a large beverage occupying the front cup holder obstructs the driver's ability to pull the hand brake. European cars were given a redesigned retractable cup holder in front.

The front bumper cover offered inadequate ground clearance to clear a curb in a parking space, whereby the bumper cover could hook onto the curb and be torn off the vehicle. In the US, a class-action lawsuit regarding this problem was filed in 2009, and a settlement was reached awarding owners a $140 reimbursement for repair costs.

Owners reported windows falling into the doors, electrical problems, body panels rusting from the inside out, especially on the front wheel arches and wagon lift door, and emissions system defects. The fourth generation takes approximately 52 hours per vehicle to assemble in the Puebla factory.

Engines

Bora Variant (wagon/estate version)

Volkswagen introduced an estate/station wagon version of the fourth-generation car at the 2001 Los Angeles Auto Show as the first  A-segment wagon Volkswagen offered in North America — the body style solely manufactured in Wolfsburg. The wagon offered 963 l (34 ft3) of volume with the rear seat up, and wth rear seats were folded provided 1473 l (52 ft3). 

In Europe, the estate version was at times marketed as a Golf wagon, either in addition to or instead of the Bora. Other than different front bumpers, fenders, headlights, and hood, the cars were identical. In some countries, VW marketed both Golf Variant and Bora Variant, with the Bora Variant being more upmarket than its counterpart.

Extended production

As of 2008, the fourth-generation car marketed alongside the fifth-generation due to higher pricing of the fifth-generation in some countries such as Colombia, China, Canada, Dominican Republic, Mexico, Brazil, and Argentina. Like its second-generation predecessor, the Mark 4 continued to be manufactured and marketed in China by Volkswagen Group's joint venture partner FAW-Volkswagen.

In October 2006, Volkswagen re-released the fourth-generation Golf and Jetta in Canada (for the 2007 model year) as the City Jetta, to allow Volkswagen to be more competitive in the compact class. In 2008, the car was restyled to bring its looks up to date with the Volkswagen range. Its engine was the 2.0-l, eight-valve SOHC  gasoline four-cylinder with an available six-speed tiptronic (with Sport mode) that was added as an option in 2008. In 2009, both model names were changed to Jetta City and Golf City. The two models were discontinued, the Jetta City for 2010 MY and Golf City for MY 2011. The MK4.5 City Jetta (Clásico/Bora) was manufactured alongside the fifth generation in the Puebla Assembly Plant in Mexico.

See also
List of Volkswagen Group diesel engines
List of Volkswagen Group petrol engines
Compact car
Volkswagen Group A platform

References

External links

Bora
All-wheel-drive vehicles
Compact cars
Euro NCAP small family cars
Latin NCAP small family cars
Front-wheel-drive vehicles
Sedans
Station wagons
Cars powered by VR engines
Cars introduced in 1999
2000s cars